Annabella Gloria Philomena Sciorra (born March 29, 1960) is an American actress. She came to prominence with her film debut in True Love (1989), earning an Independent Spirit nomination for Best Female Lead. Subsequent projects included a mixture of mainstream and small-scale films in the drama, comedy, action and thriller genres, such as Cadillac Man, Internal Affairs, Reversal of Fortune (all 1990), Jungle Fever (1991), The Hand That Rocks the Cradle, Whispers in the Dark (both 1992), Romeo Is Bleeding, Mr. Wonderful, The Night We Never Met (all 1993), The Cure (1995), Cop Land, Mr. Jealousy (both 1997), What Dreams May Come (1998), Chasing Liberty (2004), and Find Me Guilty (2006). She has worked with filmmaker Abel Ferrara three times: The Addiction (1995), The Funeral (1996), and New Rose Hotel (1998).

Outside of film, Sciorra has played recurring roles on Law & Order: Criminal Intent (2005–2006), ER, The L Word (both 2007), CSI (2013), GLOW, Daredevil, Luke Cage (all 2018), Truth Be Told (2019–2020), New Amsterdam, Godfather of Harlem (both 2021), and Blue Bloods (2021–2022). She also starred as Kim Vicidomini in the CBS series Queens Supreme (2003) and as Nora Skoff in Fox's Mental (2009), and was nominated for the Primetime Emmy Award for Outstanding Guest Actress in a Drama Series for portraying Gloria Trillo on The Sopranos (2001–2004). Her stage credits include The Motherfucker with the Hat (Broadway, 2011), for which she received a Theatre World Award.

Sciorra was regarded as one of the key figures of the MeToo movement after speaking out against Harvey Weinstein and subsequently testifying at his sexual assault trial.

Early life
Sciorra was born in the Brooklyn borough of New York City to Italian immigrant parents. Her mother was a fashion stylist from Formia, Lazio, and her father a veterinarian from Carunchio, Abruzzo. Sciorra studied dance as a child, and later took drama lessons at the Herbert Berghof Studio and the American Academy of Dramatic Arts.

Career

1989–1990: Film debut and early work 

After making her professional acting debut with a supporting role in the 1988 television miniseries The Fortunate Pilgrim, where she appeared alongside Sophia Loren, Sciorra made her feature film debut playing the character of Donna in the 1989 romantic comedy-drama True Love. Her performance was praised by critics, with Janet Maslin of The New York Times commenting, "Ms. Sciorra, with her gentle beauty and hard-as-nails negotiating style, perfectly captures the mood of the film, and makes Donna fully and touchingly drawn". The part earned Sciorra a nomination for the Independent Spirit Award for Best Female Lead the following year.

Various film roles came next, including the Richard Gere thriller Internal Affairs, the Robin Williams comedy Cadillac Man, and the acclaimed drama Reversal of Fortune, in which she co-starred with Glenn Close and Jeremy Irons (all 1990). The latter received three Academy Award nominations.

1991–2000: Jungle Fever, The Hand That Rocks the Cradle, and continued film career 

Sciorra encountered widespread attention in 1991 with her co-lead role as Angie Tucci—opposite Wesley Snipes—in the acclaimed Spike Lee drama Jungle Fever, which was shortlisted for the Palme d'Or at that year's Cannes Film Festival. In his review for the Los Angeles Times, Kenneth Turan wrote that Sciorra was "possessed of considerable presence, assurance and vulnerability". The following year, she starred alongside Rebecca De Mornay in Curtis Hanson's successful psychological thriller The Hand That Rocks The Cradle (1992), which held the top position at the North American box office for four consecutive weeks. Owen Gleiberman of Entertainment Weekly felt that, with her portrayal of Claire Bartel, Sciorrra "brings her eye-of-the-storm serenity to the role of a passionately ordinary middle-class woman", giving an "accomplished performance", while Variety said in their review: "A totally deglamorized Sciorra becomes unglued subtly and slowly, eliciting sympathy without begging for it". In subsequent years the film has been regarded as one of the quintessential examples of 1990s genre filmmaking.

Sciorra continued to work steadily throughout the decade. Film parts included the romantic lead—opposite Matthew Broderick—in The Night We Never Met; neo-noir crime thriller Romeo Is Bleeding, with Gary Oldman; Mr. Wonderful, with Matt Dillon (all 1993); cult filmmaker Abel Ferrara's The Addiction (1995) and The Funeral (1996); James Mangold's box office hit Cop Land (1997), with Sylvester Stallone and Robert De Niro; and the fantasy drama What Dreams May Come (1998), in which she co-starred for a second time with Robin Williams. Film critic Roger Ebert described her portrayal of Annie Nielsen in the latter as "heartbreakingly effective".

2001–present: The Sopranos and subsequent television roles 

In 2001, Sciorra received a Primetime Emmy Award nomination in the category of Outstanding Guest Actress for her portrayal of Gloria Trillo on HBO's acclaimed crime drama The Sopranos, a part—described as "career changing" by Entertainment Weekly—she played intermittently until 2004.

In 2006, she co-starred with Vin Diesel in Find Me Guilty, directed by Sidney Lumet. The film, based on the true story of the longest Mafia trial in American history, was described as "gripping" by Stephen Holden of The New York Times, who also called Sciorra's performance "excellent".

Subsequent credits included starring roles in the CBS courtroom drama series Queens Supreme (2003) and the Fox medical drama Mental (2009), a recurring role as Detective Carolyn Barek on Law & Order: Criminal Intent (2005–2006), and guest appearances on shows such as The L Word, ER, The Good Wife, CSI: Crime Scene Investigation, and GLOW.

In 2018, Sciorra played the guest role of Rosalie Carbone on the second season of Netflix's Luke Cage. Of Sciorra's casting, executive producer Cheo Hodari Coker said: "I've been a huge fan of hers since Jungle Fever, and [she's] no joke as Rosalie Carbone. You haven't seen her this gangster since [...] The Sopranos. I'm thrilled her introduction to the Marvel Universe will be [this show]". Later that year, she reprised the role of Carbone for two episodes of Netflix's Daredevil.

Between 2019–2020, Sciorra played the role of Erin Buhrman in seven episodes of the Apple TV+ series Truth Be Told.

Personal life
Sciorra was married to actor Joe Petruzzi from 1989 to 1993. In 2004, she began a relationship with Bobby Cannavale which lasted for three years; the relationship ended in 2007.

In October 2017, Sciorra leveled allegations of rape against the film producer Harvey Weinstein. In an article published by The New Yorker, Sciorra alleged that Weinstein raped her after he forced his way into her apartment in 1993, then over a number of years repeatedly harassed her. Sciorra was the key witness addressing the predatory sexual assault charges during Weinstein's trial in 2020, leading to his conviction.

Filmography

Film

Television

Stage

Awards and nominations

Notes

References

External links

 
 
 

20th-century American actresses
21st-century American actresses
Actresses from New York City
American Academy of Dramatic Arts alumni
American film actresses
American people of Italian descent
American stage actresses
American television actresses
People of Lazian descent
People of Abruzzese descent
Living people
People from Brooklyn
1960 births